Christine R. Savage (born August 5, 1931) is an American politician from Maine. Savage served in the Maine Legislature from 1994 to 2008, including six years in the Maine House of Representatives and eight years in the Maine Senate. She also served on the Union Board of Selectmen.

Savage studied public administration at the University of Maine.

References

1931 births
Living people
People from Union, Maine
Maine local politicians
Republican Party members of the Maine House of Representatives
Republican Party Maine state senators
University of Maine alumni
Women state legislators in Maine
21st-century American politicians
21st-century American women politicians